The Flight That Disappeared (a.k.a. Flight That Disappeared) is a 1961, independently made, black-and-white science fiction film, produced by  Robert E. Kent, directed by Reginald Le Borg, that stars Craig Hill, Paula Raymond, and Dayton Lummis. The film was released by United Artists.

The film's storyline deals with an alien abduction. When his flight disappears, a rocket scientist finds himself on trial in the future for his part in designing a weapon that has destroyed all life on Earth.

Plot
Trans-Coast Airways Flight 60 leaves Los Angeles on a flight to Washington, D.C. Three scientists on board the transcontinental flight have been summoned to a classified meeting at the Pentagon, concerning the "beta bomb", a new bomb design and the rocket to deliver it. Mid-flight, the Douglas DC-6 airliner mysteriously begins to climb, to over 10 miles high. Back at the airline headquarters, Operations Manager Hank Norton (John Bryant) tries to keep in contact with the flight, but is sure that nothing can be done to save the passengers and crew.

The engines stop, and passengers pass out due to lack of oxygen. Crazed passenger Walter Cooper (Harvey Stephens) who has tried to convince others that using the secret bomb is essential, jumps from the aircraft. Three scientists, Dr. Carl Morris (Dayton Lummis), Tom Endicott (Craig Hill) and Marcia Paxton (Paula Raymond) find themselves in a limbo state, watches stopped and no heartbeats.

Meeting the Examiner (Gregory Morton), the trio of scientists leave the aircraft for judgement from those of the future. They find themselves in a moment between time, which explains the stopped watches and lack of heartbeats. They are shown, in brief, a future where their bomb has been used and having destroyed the atmosphere, has killed off all life on the planet. They are judged guilty and sentenced to live in the moment with no time for the rest of eternity, where the future and past meet.

After the Sage (Addison Richards) objects that the scientists from the past cannot be judged by a future society, they are returned to the present on this technicality. The passengers have no memory of any of the actions on board before passing out, with the exception of Endicott, the rocket engineer and Dr. Morris. Marcia Paxton only thinks that the event was a dream. Walter Cooper reappears, and the flight crew do not seem to have any recall of the emergency that took place on the flight.

When Captain Hank Norton (John Bryant) calls for landing instructions, the airline office is perplexed. When their airliner lands at Washington, the passengers and crew discover that they are 24 hours late, thus proving Endicott's fantastic story of the trial and judgement. Dr. Morris, the nuclear bomb designer, disposes of his notebook containing the formulas and designs for the bomb.

Cast

 Craig Hill as Tom Endicott
 Paula Raymond as Marcia Paxton
 Dayton Lummis as Dr. Carl Morris
 Meg Wyllie as Helen Cooper
 Gregory Morton as The Examiner
 Harvey Stephens as Walter Cooper
 John Bryant as Hank Norton
 Nancy Hale as Barbara Nielsen
 Addison Richards as The Sage
 Brad Trumbull as Jack Peters
 Bernadette Hale as Joan Agnew
 Roy Engel as Jameson (credited as Roy Engle)

Production
The inflight scenes of The Flight That Disappeared were photographed in a studio-made airliner fuselage, passenger section, lounge and cockpit section, while background scenes were shot at Los Angeles Airport. The 2 by 2 seating is correct, but the single aisle is wider than on the prototype, possibly to facilitate camera work.

Reception
TV Guide gave the film 2-out-of-4 stars and wrote that The Flight That Disappeared becomes "more relevant with time". Aviation film historian Stephen Pendo, in his critique of this low-budget film, wrote, "The incredible plot makes the film all but unwatchable", and the poster showing a "jetliner" didn't help matters.

See also
 List of American films of 1961

References

Notes

Citations

Bibliography

 Pendo, Stephen. Aviation in the Cinema. Lanham, Maryland: Scarecrow Press, 1985. .
 Warren, Bill. Keep Watching The Skies, American Science Fiction Movies of the 1950s, Vol II: 1958 - 1962 (covers late 1950s movies not released until the early 1960s). Jefferson, North Carolina: McFarland & Company, 1986. .

External links
 
 

1961 films
1960s science fiction films
American science fiction films
1960s English-language films
American aviation films
American black-and-white films
United Artists films
Films directed by Reginald Le Borg
Films scored by Richard LaSalle
1960s American films